The 2008 Manly Warringah Sea Eagles season was the 62nd in the club's history. Coached by Des Hasler and captained by Matt Orford, they competed in the National Rugby League's 2008 Telstra Premiership.

Season Summary
With the departure of hooker Michael Monaghan, many questioned whether the Manly Warringah Sea Eagles could be as competitive as in 2007 and losses in the first 2 rounds seemed to confirm this. Manly Warringah's first win came in round 3 at Brookvale with a 52–6 thrashing of the New Zealand Warriors and followed this up with a 20–2 shutout of South Sydney. In the round 5 grand final rematch against the Storm, Manly were soundly beaten 26–4 and doubt about their premiership credentials resurfaced. In Heritage Round (Rd 6) Manly Warringah had a season defining last gasp win over bitter rivals Parramatta, with Manly overcoming injuries before and during the game including one to winger Michael Bani who had to be stretchered off the ground after being knocked out.

Manly Warringah seemed to use this game as a springboard and entered a dangerous run of form, notching up numerous impressive wins over top teams such as a 30–12 win over the Brisbane Broncos at Suncorp Stadium, a 42–0 annihilation of the Sydney Roosters at Brookvale Oval and a 34–14 win over the Gold Coast Titans at Skilled Park in round 17. In round 18 Manly avenged their opening round loss to bitter rivals and eventual preliminary finalists Cronulla with a 34–6 hammering of them at Toyota Stadium. In round 19, Manly once again faced historical rivals Parramatta and in a repeat of round 6, Manly lost halfback Matt Orford and lock Luke Williamson before the game, and after only minutes five-eighth Jamie Lyon and prop Jason King were forced off the field with injury. Despite the setbacks and an early challenge from the Eels, Manly ran away with the game and finished 28–10 winners.

Some hiccups against the Roosters in round 20, the Storm in round 22 and the Rabbitohs in round 23 meant Manly finished the regular season tied first with Melbourne and Cronulla but second on points differential and Manly missed out on claiming their first minor premiership since 1997. In the qualifying final Manly faced 7th placed St. George at Brookvale. This game was club legend Steve Menzies' last game at Brookvale and he opened the scoring with an unusual charge down try in which after kicking ahead to himself and falling over, the ball bounced up and hit him in the head before he finally grounded it. Manly Warringah were easy 38–6 winners and departing Dragons centre Mark Gasnier was seen on the sidelines crying. After getting the week off, Manly faced the history-making New Zealand Warriors whose late season charge got them into 8th place where they became the first 8th placed team to advance past qualifying finals with a dramatic and rare defeat of the Storm at Olympic Park. Despite an early challenge, Manly Warringah crushed the Warriors 32–6 and showcased their trademark wall of defence and attacking flair. With the win, Manly Warringah qualified for their 17th grand final, where in a rematch of the 2007 decider, they would play the Melbourne Storm who had bounced back from the Warriors' loss with wins over the Brisbane Broncos and Cronulla Sharks.

The story was very different for the Sea Eagles this time around as they decimated the Storm 40–0 to win their seventh premiership in front of 80,388 at ANZ Stadium. It was Michael Monaghan's replacement, the previously unknown Matt Ballin who scored the first try of the match. The game was also notable for winger Michael Robertson's hat-trick and retiring legend Steve Menzies' try 10 minutes from full-time, which he scored after coming back onto the field to replace the injured Steve Matai. Manly prop forward Brent Kite was awarded the Clive Churchill Medal after a powerhouse display which included a classy try in the 58th minute. This is the largest winning margin in a grand final in rugby league history.

Regular season

Bye

Bye

Finals

Qualifying Final

Preliminary Final

Grand Final

1st Half
The grand final's first quarter was played end to end with each side able to hold the other's attacking opportunities out. In the twenty-fourth minute the Sea Eagles' hooker Matt Ballin  at close-range ran from dummy-half and crashed over the try-line. After the video referee ruled the grounding successful, Matt Orford's conversion attempt hit the upright and missed so the score remained 4 - 0 with fifteen minutes of the first half remaining. Nine minutes later, the Sea Eagles were again on the attack and from ten metres out, moved the ball through the hands to the left wing where Michael Robertson dived over in the corner. The video referee was again called upon to examine the try, which was ruled to have been successfully scored just as Robertson's feet were being dragged onto the sideline by a defender. Orford's difficult kick went wide, so the Sea Eagles' lead remained at 8-0 with under five minutes of the half remaining which were played out with no further points scored.

2nd Half
In the forty-seventh minute, The Sea Eagles were within twenty metres of the Storm's try-line when Matt Orford at first receiver put a grubber kick into the left corner which bounced up perfectly for Michael Robertson racing through on the wing to grab and dive over for his second try. Kicking duty was handed to Steve Matai who coolly converted Robertson's try from next to the sideline, bringing his side's lead to 14–0. Three minutes later, and from a similar attacking position, the Sea Eagles kept the ball alive, a pass from Brett Stewart fifteen metres out arriving at the feet of Steve Matai who, with only one defender before him, picked it up and passed to Michael Robertson to dive over again in the same corner. Matai's second sideline conversion attempt missed, so the Sea Eagles were leading 18–0. In the fifty-seventh minute the Sea Eagles were again down in the Storm's half and on the last tackle decided to run the ball, which was kept alive and passed through seven sets of hands before going to a charging Brent Kite who stretched out of the tackle and slammed the ball down under the posts. Matai kicked the easy conversion and it was sea Eagles 24, Storm 0. Ten minutes later the Sea Eagles got another try when, from within the Storm's ten-metre line, they moved the ball out to David Williams on the right wing to dive over in the corner. The conversion attempt by Matai went wide so the Sea Eagles were leading 28–0. In the seventy-second minute the Sea Eagles ran the ball down toward the left corner with Robertson passing back in to Steve Menzies, who was playing in his 349th and final NRL match to crash over for a try, his 180th. Jamie Lyon took over the goal kicking and converted Menzies' try to give Manly a 34–0 lead. However, the finale was to come at the seventy-five-minute mark when from their forty-metre line, Sea Eagles second rower Glenn Hall burst into open space, passing back inside for Brett Stewart who was running through in support. Stewart was chased down just short of the try-line by Storm halfback Cooper Cronk, but he managed to flick the ball back without looking into the arms of Steven Bell to also get a try in his last game at the club. Jamie Lyon's simple conversion put the final score at 40–0.

It was at the time the fourth-biggest loss in the Storm's history.

The Manly Warringah Sea Eagles defeated the Melbourne Storm 40–0, scoring eight tries, four of which were converted. This is the highest Rugby League Grand Final margin in Australian history, eclipsing the 1975 NSWRFL season's Grand Final where Eastern Suburbs defeated St George, 38–0 at the Sydney Cricket Ground. It is also the first time that a team has been kept scoreless in a Grand Final since the 1978 NSWRL Grand Final Replay, where Cronulla lost to Manly 16–0. Sea Eages forward Brent Kite was named man-of-the-match and received the Clive Churchill Medal.

The 2008 Grand Final was the last match for Super League-bound Steve Menzies of Manly. Playing in this match brought his career games played to 349, equalling the current record from Terry Lamb.

Player statistics
Note: Games and (sub) show total games played, e.g. 1 (1) is 2 games played.

Representative Players

International

 Australia – Brent Kite, Josh Perry, Brett Stewart*, Glenn Stewart, Anthony Watmough, David Williams
 New Zealand – Steve Matai
 Fiji – Nick Bradley-Qalilawa
 Scotland – Michael Robertson

* Brett Stewart was originally selected in Australia's World Cup squad but withdrew with a shoulder injury.

State

 New South Wales – Brett Stewart

City vs Country
 Country Origin – Glenn Stewart

References

Manly Warringah Sea Eagles seasons
Manly Warringah Sea Eagles season